Salman Davud (also Romanized as Salmān Dāvūd) is a village in Ahudasht Rural District, Shavur District, Shush County, Khuzestan Province, Iran. At the 2006 census, its population was 690, in 102 families.

References 

Populated places in Shush County